MAX is a bus rapid transit network operated by Calgary Transit in Calgary, Alberta, Canada. MAX forms a part of Calgary Transit's rapid transit network, along with the CTrain light rail system.

The MAX system opened in November 2018 with three routes: MAX Orange, MAX Teal, and MAX Purple. The MAX Yellow line opened in December 2019. MAX routes are distinguished from Calgary's existing express bus network, branded as "BRT", by the use of dedicated transitway on three lines, heated shelters, real-time information, and elevated sidewalks.

Routes

BRT routes
In addition to the MAX network, Calgary Transit operates four separate routes branded as "BRT". They are not considered to be part of Calgary's rapid transit network, and do not use dedicated transitway, heated shelter, real-time information, or elevated sidewalks.

Fares

MAX services use the same fare structure as the rest of the Calgary Transit system. As of January 2020, a single adult fare is $3.50, or $2.40 for youth. Day, monthly, low-income, and university passes are also available.

Transitways

Southwest Transitway
The Southwest Transitway is a bus-only corridor along 14 Street SW, between 75 Avenue SW and Southland Drive. It has three stations along its length, used by MAX Yellow. MAX Teal also uses a portion of the Transitway. Both routes operate in mixed traffic and shoulder lanes for the rest of their routing.

17 Avenue SE Transitway
The 17 Avenue SE Transitway is a bus-only corridor along 17 Avenue SE, between 9 Avenue SE and Hubalta Road SE It has six stations along its length, used by MAX Purple.

See also
Calgary Transit
CTrain

References

2018 establishments in Alberta
Bus rapid transit in Canada
MAX (Calgary)